Ángel Santamarina (born 28 January 1894, date of death unknown) was an Argentine fencer. He competed in the team foil competition at the 1924 Summer Olympics.

References

External links
 

1894 births
Year of death missing
Argentine male fencers
Argentine foil fencers
Olympic fencers of Argentina
Fencers at the 1924 Summer Olympics
Fencers from Buenos Aires